Moselem Farms Mill is a historic grist mill located in Richmond Township, Berks County, Pennsylvania.  The mill was built about 1860, and is a 2 1/2-story, with basement, banked brick building on a stone foundation. It measures 45 feet, 4 inches, by 50 feet. The merchant mill was built as part of an iron furnace complex.

It was listed on the National Register of Historic Places in 1990.

References

Grinding mills in Berks County, Pennsylvania
Grinding mills on the National Register of Historic Places in Pennsylvania
Industrial buildings completed in 1860
National Register of Historic Places in Berks County, Pennsylvania